The 1974–75 British Ice Hockey season featured the Northern League for teams from Scotland and the north of England and the Southern League for teams from the rest of England. 

Whitley Warriors won the Northern League and Streatham Redskins won the Southern League. Murrayfield Racers won the Icy Smith Cup.

Northern League

Regular season

Southern League

Regular season

Spring Cup

Final
Fife Flyers' defeated the Murrayfield Racers

Icy Smith Cup

Final
Murrayfield Racers defeated Streatham Redskins 12-9

Autumn Cup

Game results
Glasgow Dynamos 6 - Dundee Rockets 8
All other results unknown

Top of table

Statistics and full list of teams unavailable. Other known teams, with unknown placements: Glasgow, Dundee.

References

British
1974 in English sport
1975 in English sport
1974 in Scottish sport
1975 in Scottish sport